Andreas Kopasis was the Ottoman-appointed Prince of Samos from 1908 to 1912. His tenure was widely regarded as pro-Turkish and tyrannical. His bringing in of additional Ottoman troops in 1908 caused a revolt to break out among the Samians, which was quelled brutally by further Ottoman reinforcements. The leaders of the pro-Greek opposition, including Themistoklis Sophoulis, fled the island for Greece. Kopasis was assassinated by a pro-Sophoulis agent on 22 March 1912.

1856 births
1912 deaths
Assassinated politicians
People murdered in Greece
Princes of Samos
20th-century rulers in Europe
People from Sfakia
Politicians from Crete